Ready to Mingle is a 2019 Mexican romantic comedy film directed by Luis Javier Henaine, written by Luis Javier Henaine, Alejandra Olvera Avila and starring Cassandra Ciangherotti, Gabriela de la Garza and Irán Castillo. The plot revolves around Ana (Cassandra Ciangherotti) who in her search for a husband turns to a professional for help.

Cast

References

External links 
 
 

2019 films
2019 romantic comedy films
Mexican romantic comedy films
Spanish-language Netflix original films
2010s Spanish-language films
2010s Mexican films